Fonte Boa (literally, "good water spring") is a municipality located in the Brazilian state of Amazonas. Its population was 17,005 (2020) and its area is 12,111 km².

The city is served by Fonte Boa Airport.

The municipality contains 45% of the  Auatí-Paraná Extractive Reserve, created in 2001.

Climate

References

Municipalities in Amazonas (Brazilian state)
Populated places on the Amazon